The women's doubles table tennis event at the 2019 Pan American Games will be held from August 4 – 5 at the Polideportivo 3 in Lima, Peru.

Results

Draw

References

External links
Draw results

Women's doubles